The Kharlamov Trophy is an ice hockey award given to the best Russian player of the previous season.

The current winner, for the 2018–19 season is Nikita Kucherov.

History 
The Trophy was established by Sovetsky Sport in 2002, and is named after the legendary Soviet ice hockey player Valeri Kharlamov. Presentation of the award and the ceremony are held by Sovetsky Sport every summer in Moscow.

2002–2015: Best Russian Player in the NHL 
Between 2002 and 2015 only players from the NHL were eligible for the award. Voting took place at the conclusion of each season. Every Russian player, who'd played at least one game in the NHL during that season, would be allowed to name his top 3 candidates in a 1st-2nd-3rd format. Players could not vote for themselves.

The award was a de facto, Best Russian NHL player award.

2016–present: Best Russian Player in the World 
Starting with the 2016 award, the voting participation as well as eligibility rules were greatly modified.

Eligibility was expanded, to any Russian player from the National Hockey League or the Kontinental Hockey League. As the KHL is a predominantly Russian league, the number of potential contenders for the award is now in the hundreds.

With the number of candidates heavily increased, the voting process was revamped as well. With the 2016 award onward, a shortlist of the 20 best players from the NHL and KHL is compiled. It is then voted on by a selection committee composed of five groups of experts, each consisting of 13 individuals, plus the past award winners.

Voting membership 
 Committee of the Russian Hall of Fame
 Russian hockey veterans/legends
 Group of KHL general managers
 Russian hockey press/writers
 Television commentators
 Past winners of the award

List of winners

See also
 Viking Award

References

Russian ice hockey trophies and awards
National Hockey League trophies and awards